The Armenian community of the San Francisco Bay Area is not to the degree that of Los Angeles’, percent or number-wise, but has an impact on some businesses, churches, and politics of San Francisco. There are about 2,500 Armenians in the Bay Area according to a San Francisco Examiner article, but an ABC7 News article from the same year (2021) says the population of the Bay Area is at around 50,000.

Historical features
Mount Davidson in San Francisco has been the subject of much debate among the residents of San Francisco as they have tried to weigh its religious role against its status as an historic landmark. In 1991 the American Civil Liberties Union, the American Jewish Congress, and Americans United for Separation of Church and State sued the city over its ownership of the cross. After a long legal battle and loss at the Ninth Circuit Court of Appeals, in 1997 the City auctioned  of land, including the cross, to the highest bidder. The decision to sell the land was challenged by two members of the group American Atheists, but a federal appeals court ruled against them in 2002 and the Supreme Court declined to hear their case in 2003.

Notable individuals
George Mardikian, a chef and restaurateur, in 1938, opened Omar Khayyam's restaurant in San Francisco, California, which was open for more than 40 years. He was important in popularizing Armenian cuisine in the United States. Mardikian was the founder of ANCHA (American National Committee To Aid Homeless Armenians).

Schools and businesses
There is an Armenian school in San Francisco, Krouzian-Zekarian-Vasbouragan Armenian School.

See also
 Armenian American
 Armenian Diaspora

References

Armenian-American culture in California